Yugant is a 1995 Bengali drama movie directed by Aparna Sen. The movie featured Anjan Dutt and Roopa Ganguly.

Plot
Deepak and Anasuya are an estranged couple, now leading separate lives in Cuttack and Bombay. They meet again after 18 months of separation, at a small fishing village where they had once honeymooned. Though driven apart by their careers, Deepak and Anasuya realize that their feelings for each other have not changed, and slowly they struggle for reconciliation.

Though this may be the story's outline (a fictional line for screenplay), the film really speaks about the Gulf war (war for Oil) and its impact on our environment, living creatures and humans.

Cast

Awards
1995 : National Film Awards
 Best Feature Film in Bengali
 Best Choreography: Ileana Citaristi

References

External links

1995 films
Bengali-language Indian films
Films featuring a Best Choreography National Film Award-winning choreography
Best Bengali Feature Film National Film Award winners
Films directed by Aparna Sen
1990s Bengali-language films
National Film Development Corporation of India films